Şule Yüksel Şenler (29 May 1938 – 28 August 2019) was a Turkish writer, journalist. Throughout her life, she struggled for the freedom of Turkish women to practice their religion by putting headscarf and proposed an Islamic view and lifestyle. Moreover, she was the designer of so-called "Türban", instead of the traditional "Başörtüsü" that was common in Anatolia for centuries, in which she had learned from an Armenian tailor.

Biography
Yüksel Şenler was born in Kayseri on 29 May 1938 into a family of Turkish Cypriot origin. She later adopted "Şule" as a first name. When she was young, she emigrated to Istanbul with her family. She left school when in 8th Grade, and started working for an Armenian tailor. This led her to create her own model of a modern headscarf in the future.

She started to work as a journalist at the age of 21. In 1965, she began wearing the hijab. Lawsuits were brought against her due to her articles in Yeni İstiklal newspaper, in which she encouraged women to wear the hijab.
She grew up during a time when Turkey pushed secularism, where women had to choose between hijab, or official schooling and professional careers. She traveled around Anatolia and started discussions at conferences, and many of her followers started wearing the headscarf. After some girls started to imitate her head covering style, this type of covering became known as sulebaşı. One conference caught the attention of then-president Cevdet Sunay, who said "Those behind [the increasing number of] covered women on the streets, will be punished". Senler responded in a letter to Cevdet Sunay and was arrested, serving eight months in prison. Şenler wrote for Hür Söz, Yeni İstiklal, and Babıalide Sabah women's pages. After 1980, she wrote for Zaman and Milli Gazete. Şenler's novel Huzur Sokağı ("Peace Street") became a popular TV drama. Despite her advanced age and illness, Şenler continued to occasionally publish articles in newspapers and magazines. She died on 28 August 2019 from a heart attack in Istanbul.

Selected works 
Gençliğin Izdırabı
Hidayet
Bize Ne Oldu
İslam'da ve Günümüzde Kadın
Duyuşlar
Her Şey İslam için
Uygarlığın Gözyaşları
Huzur Sokağı
Kız ve Çiçek
Sağ El
Bir Bilinçli Öğretmen
Yılanla Tilki

References

1938 births
2019 deaths
Turkish people of Cypriot descent
People from Kayseri
20th-century Turkish writers
21st-century Turkish writers
Turkish women journalists
Turkish Islamists
Burials at Eyüp Cemetery
Female critics of feminism
Hijab
Controversies in Turkey